Laurence Bensimon (born 24 January 1963) is a French freestyle and medley swimmer. She competed in four events at the 1984 Summer Olympics.

References

External links
 

1963 births
Living people
French female medley swimmers
Olympic swimmers of France
Swimmers at the 1984 Summer Olympics
Place of birth missing (living people)
Mediterranean Games medalists in swimming
Mediterranean Games gold medalists for France
Swimmers at the 1983 Mediterranean Games
French female freestyle swimmers